1AZ may refer to:

Toyota 1AZ
OneAZ Credit Union

See also
 AZ (disambiguation)
 AZ1 (disambiguation)
 Iaz (disambiguation)
 laz (disambiguation)